The Under 20 Elite League, also known as the European Elite League, is an under-20 (U20) association football tournament founded in 2017. Competed in by national European U20 teams, it is the successor to the Under-20 Four Nations Tournament.

The tournament's first winners were Germany, with Netherlands victorious in 2018–19.

Seasons
 2017–18 winner: 
 2018–19 winner: 
 2019–20 (curtailed due to COVID-19 pandemic)
 2020–21 (not scheduled due to COVID-19 pandemic)
 2021–22: winner: 
 2022–23: Ongoing

References

 
Recurring sporting events established in 2017
International association football competitions in Europe
Under-20 association football
Under-20 sports competitions